Heloclusia is a genus of flies in the family Pseudopomyzidae.

Distribution
Chile, Argentina.

Species
Heloclusia imperfecta Malloch, 1933

References

Pseudopomyzidae
Brachycera genera
Taxa named by John Russell Malloch
Diptera of South America